Dragon Peak is a  mountain summit located in the Athabasca River valley of Jasper National Park, in the Canadian Rockies of Alberta, Canada. Situated southeast of Mount Christie and Brussels Peak, Dragon Peak can be seen from the Icefields Parkway. The first ascent of the mountain was made in 1979 by D. Waterman. Dragon Peak was named in 1921 by Arthur O. Wheeler on account of a dragon-shaped rock formation. The mountain's name was officially adopted in 1935 by the Geographical Names Board of Canada.

Geology

Dragon Peak is composed of sedimentary rock laid down from the Precambrian to Jurassic periods, then pushed east and over the top of younger rock during the Laramide orogeny.

Climate

Based on the Köppen climate classification, Dragon Peak is located in a subarctic climate with long, cold, snowy winters, and short mild summers.

See also
List of mountains of Canada
Geology of Alberta
Geology of the Rocky Mountains

References

External links
 Parks Canada web site: Jasper National Park

Two-thousanders of Alberta
Mountains of Jasper National Park